Antonio Fazio (born 11 October 1936 in Alvito, province of Frosinone) is an Italian banker, who was the Governor of Banca d'Italia from 1993 until his resignation amidst controversy at of 2005.

After graduating in economics in 1960, he continued his studies at the Massachusetts Institute of Technology. He was assistant professor of Demographics at the Faculty of Economics of Rome University (La Sapienza) and Economic Consultant to the Economic Research Department of the Bank of Italy, which he joined as a staff economist in 1966.

He is reported to be very religious, and close to the Vatican. He has five children.

Career
He started work at the Bank of Italy in 1960. In 1993, after his predecessor Carlo Azeglio Ciampi left office to become the Italian Prime Minister, he became governor of the Bank of Italy. Some years after his appointment, it was said that he was interested in the leadership of the left-wing coalition to beat Berlusconi's right wing one. After Berlusconi won the 2001 general election, however, he came to be considered closer to the centre-right.

The Antonveneta affair
In 2005, Fazio came under heavy pressure to resign (which he eventually did) over his role in allegedly rigging the competition to take over an Italian bank, Banca Antonveneta, earlier in the year. Published excerpts of tapped telephone calls strongly suggest that Fazio favoured an Italian bid, probably in order to sabotage a foreign bid from Dutch bank ABN AMRO.

Reaction of the government
Silvio Berlusconi's government, itself in troubled times because of the utter defeat in the regional elections of April 2005, was accused of weakness for not kicking Fazio out of office. On 21 September 2005, economy minister Domenico Siniscalco resigned in protest against the lack of determination in the government. The government maintained that it had no power to remove the governor of the central bank.

Investigations and resignation
Gianpiero Fiorani was arrested on 14 December 2005 for investigation of his role in the affair, and Fazio was officially put under investigation in Milan for insider trading on 16 December. He is also under investigation in Rome for having pressured the apparatus of the Bank of Italy to give green light to Fiorani's takeover of Antonveneta.

Although he had resisted calls to resign for months, these latest developments were the last straw, and Fazio stepped down on 19 December 2005. A new governor, Mario Draghi, was appointed on 29 December 2005.

On 28 May 2011, An Italian court sentenced him four years in jail for market-rigging related to a 2005 takeover battle over Italian bank Banca Antonveneta. A Milan court has also ordered Fazio – who headed the Bank of Italy from 1993 to 2005 – to pay a 1.5 million euro ($2.14 million) fine for his role in the takeover saga pitting Dutch Bank ABN AMRO against Italy's Banca Popolare Italiana (BPI).

References
 
Fazio under investigation for insider trading, article from La Repubblica.
 Governor Fazio's daughter becomes a lay nun, article from La Repubblica.
 "Siniscalco: 'No more immobilism, I will go back to working as a professor'", article from La Repubblica.
Fazio shamed out of office at last, article from The Economist Global Agenda, 19 December 2005.

|-

1936 births
Living people
Governors of the Bank of Italy
Italian bankers
People from the Province of Frosinone